Anne of Green Gables is a 1972 made-for-television British mini-series directed by Joan Craft based upon the 1908 novel Anne of Green Gables by Lucy Maud Montgomery.

Despite many of the BBC's costume drama serials made during the 1970s surviving, all five episodes of this serial were wiped and it is effectively considered lost.

Cast
 Kim Braden - Anne Shirley
 Christopher Blake - Gilbert Blythe
 Barbara Hamilton - Marilla Cuthbert
 Elliott Sullivan - Matthew Cuthbert
 Jan Francis - Diana Barry
 Avis Bunnage - Rachel Lynde

Sequel
Joan Craft returned to direct the 1975 sequel Anne of Avonlea, also starring Kim Braden. It is based on the second and third books of the series, Anne of Avonlea and Anne of the Island.

External links
 
 Anne of Green Gables, 1972 BBC Miniseries at An L.M. Montgomery Resource Page

1972 films
Anne of Green Gables television series
1972 comedy films
British comedy films
1970s British comedy television series
Anne of Green Gables films
1970s English-language films
1970s British films